Besaia sordida is a moth of the family Notodontidae first described by Alfred Ernest Wileman in 1914. It is found in Taiwan.

References

Moths described in 1914
Notodontidae